Leszek Melchior Drogosz (6 January 1933 – 7 September 2012) was a Polish boxer and actor.

Drogosz was born in Kielce.  He thrice won the gold medal at the European Amateur Boxing Championships in the Light welterweight division at Warsaw 1953 and West Berlin 1955, and in the Welterweight division at Lucerne 1959. He participated in the Summer Olympics in Helsinki 1952, Melbourne 1956, and Rome 1960. He won the bronze medal at the 1960 Summer Olympics in Rome.

He was eight-time winner of the Polish Boxing Championship (1953, 1954, 1955, 1958, 1960, 1961, 1964, 1967).

Following his boxing career, Drogosz became an actor in Polish movies. He played in fifteen movies. In 1966 he has appeared in the film Bokser directed by Julian Dziedzina. He twice played in the movies directed by Andrzej Wajda - Hunting Flies in 1969, and Landscape After the Battle in 1970.

In 1988, he was chosen the best Polish Sportspersonality of the Year 1953 (no award rewarded in 1953) in a Plebiscite of the Sport Review.

He was the winner of the Aleksander Reksza Boxing Award 1992.

He died of cancer in 2012.

References

1933 births
2012 deaths
Actors from Kielce
Boxers at the 1952 Summer Olympics
Boxers at the 1956 Summer Olympics
Boxers at the 1960 Summer Olympics
Olympic boxers of Poland
Olympic bronze medalists for Poland
Olympic medalists in boxing
Polish male film actors
Sportspeople from Kielce
Polish male boxers
Medalists at the 1960 Summer Olympics
Welterweight boxers
21st-century Polish people
20th-century Polish people